Rankism is "abusive, discriminatory, and/or exploitative behavior towards people because of their rank in a particular hierarchy".
Rank-based abuse underlies many other phenomena such as bullying, racism, hazing, ageism, sexism, ableism, mentalism, antisemitism, homophobia and transphobia. The term "rankism" was popularized by physicist, educator, and citizen diplomat Robert W. Fuller.

Characteristics 

Rankism can take many forms, including
 exploiting one's position within a hierarchy to secure unwarranted advantages and benefits (e.g. massive corporate bonuses);
 abusing a position of power (e.g., abusive parent or priest, corrupt CEO, bully boss, prisoner abuse);
 using rank as a shield to get away with insulting or humiliating others with impunity;
 using rank to maintain a position of power long after it can be justified;
 exporting the rank achieved in one sphere of activity to claim superior value as a person;
 exploiting rank that is illegitimately acquired or held (as in situations resting on specious distinctions of social rank, such as racism, sexism, intellectualism, wealth, religious beliefs, hereditary, marital status, gang affiliation, criminal record, egotism or classism).

Rankism can occur in any social hierarchy, such as governments, corporations, families, non-profit organizations, and universities.

Use of term 

The term rankism first appeared in print in the Oberlin Alumni Magazine for fall of 1997. It later appeared in a book called Somebodies and Nobodies: Overcoming the Abuse of Rank, written by Fuller and published in 2003.

The first use of the term in a management journal occurred in 2001 in a Leader to Leader Institute article. The piece questioned the abuse of rank in work hierarchies. The idea of rankism has since been widely covered in the media, including The New York Times, NPR, C-SPAN, The Boston Globe, the BBC, Voice of America, and O, The Oprah Magazine.

Other notable references of rankism include Fuller's second book on the subject, All Rise: Somebodies, Nobodies, and the Politics of Dignity, and an action-oriented guide titled Dignity for All: How to Create a World Without Rankism.

The Human Dignity and Humiliation Studies (Human DHS) network has also accepted the concept of rankism as core to its mission. It asserts, "...the mission we have undertaken at Human DHS is the confrontation of abuse, rankism and the humiliation endemic to it, on the historical scale."

Professional mediator Julia Ann Wambach uses Fuller's definition of rankism to explore the abuse of position within a hierarchy from both up and down the lines of power, including how rankism feeds on itself in group contexts.

Rankism and dignity 

According to Fuller, the abuse of rank is experienced by victims as an affront to their dignity. Fuller and his supporters have launched a new social movement to promote the creation of a dignitarian society. The Dignity Movement's goal is to overcome rankism in the same way that the civil rights movement and women's movements target racism and sexism.

See also 

 Abuse
 Bullying
 Caste
 Class discrimination
 Discrimination
 Elitism
 Exploitation
 Minority influence
 Power harassment
 Ranked society
 Structural violence
 Supremacism

References

Further reading

External links 
 Academe Online - Anonymous, (September/October 2006) "Class Issues Outside the Classroom"
 Brazen Careerist - Penelope Trunk, (August 27, 2006) "Battle Cry Against Power Tripping" interview with Robert Fuller, at Brazen Careerist
 Breaking Ranks - Bibliography on Fuller's website
 Breaking Ranks - Other articles by Fuller
 Canadian Living - Diana Fisher, "Rankism: Bullying someone of a lower rank at work"
 Human Dignity and Humiliation Studies - an organization composed of over one thousand academics and practitioners from around the globe dedicated to confronting humiliation
 Dignity – SpiritualWiki article
 Right-Rank.com  –  Right-rank is the use of communication skills by anyone within a hierarchy to promote respect for the dignity of everyone regardless of position.
 SomebodyBook.com - I Feel Like Nobody When... I Feel Like a Somebody When... (children's book that introduces issues related to rankism), Stephanie Heuer (2005)
 YubaNet.com - '"Executive" monkeys influenced by other executives, not subordinates', Duke University Medical Center (March 22, 2006)

Abuse
Bullying
Discrimination by type
Social inequality
1990s neologisms